The 1997–98  Liga Leumit season began on 2 August 1997 and ended on 9 May 1998, with Beitar Jerusalem win their second consecutive title.

That season had two rounds, each team played the other teams twice. The two teams that were relegated to Liga Artzit were:  Hapoel Ashkelon and Hapoel Be'er Sheva.

Two team from Liga Artzit were promoted at the end of the previous season: Hapoel Ashkelon and Maccabi Ironi Ashdod. The two teams relegated were: Hapoel Tayibe and Hapoel Tzafririm Holon.

Final table

Results

Top scorers

References
Israel - List of Final Tables RSSSF

Liga Leumit seasons
Israel
1997–98 in Israeli football leagues